It was a Dacian fortified town.

References

Popesti
Historic monuments in Călărași County